Talayan, officially the Municipality of Talayan (Maguindanaon: Ingud nu Talayan; Iranun: Inged a Talayan), is a 4th class municipality in the province of Maguindanao del Sur, Philippines. According to the 2020 census, it has a population of 34,156 people.

Talayan was created through Presidential Decree No. 1009 by then President Ferdinand Marcos on September 22, 1976. It was carved from the municipalities of Datu Piang and Dinaig (now Datu Odin Sinsuat).

Datu Udzag Midtimbang was the first appointed mayor of entire Talayan now divided into 4 municipalities, Talitay, Datu Anggal, Talayan and Guindulungan. followed by a younger brother Datu Antao, and now Datu Ali. With these leaders, Talayan now and then remains as a place for everybody. Many projects now serve the public like concrete roads and lights in every home. A new public market is now being constructed under the leadership of Mayor Hadji Datu Ali.

Geography

Barangays
Talayan is politically subdivided into 15 barangays.
 Boboguiron
 Damablac
 Fugotan
 Fukol
 Katibpuan
 Kedati
 Lanting
 Linamunan
 Marader
 Binangga North
 Binangga South
 Talayan
 Tamar
 Tambunan I
 Timbaluan

Climate

Demographics

Economy

References

External links
 Talayan Profile at the DTI Cities and Municipalities Competitive Index
 [ Philippine Standard Geographic Code]
 2000 Philippine Census Information
 Local Governance Performance Management System

Municipalities of Maguindanao del Sur
Establishments by Philippine presidential decree